Qualia is a term used in philosophy to refer to subjective conscious experiences.

Qualia may also refer to:

Qualia (Sony), a series of electronic products produced by Sony
 Qualia (album), a 2008 album by Japanese rock band Jinn
 "Qualia" (song), a 2010 single by Japanese rock band Uverworld